Sierra High School is a high school in Manteca, California, opened in August 1994. It is a Microsoft showcase school.

Sports

Sierra High School is part of the Valley Oak League, of the CIF Sac-Joaquin Section.

It has 12 athletic teams - track, cross country, wrestling, soccer, basketball, football, baseball, softball, swimming, golf, water polo, and tennis. They have won 20 Sac-Joaquin Section Championships, 3 in cross country, 8 in track, 4 in women's soccer, 3 in softball, 1 in boys basketball, and 1 in football.

During the 2014–15 school year, Sierra became the first school in the history of the Valley Oak League to win league titles in the traditional "Big 3" sports of football, basketball and baseball during the same school year.  This year also marked the first Sac-Joaquin Section title for the boys basketball team.  Sierra's basketball team won four league titles in a row, 2012–15.

In the fall of 2015, the football team won its first Sac-Joaquin Section football title and followed that with a CIF State division IVA title by beating Chowchilla HS 20–15 on a score with 54 seconds left in the game. In the fall of 2019, the football team won its second Sac-Joaquin Section football title by beating Oakdale High School 22–19, after losing to Oakdale 38-14 during the regular season. Sierra High School finished 3-3 in the Valley Oak League, having lost to Manteca High School, Central Catholic High School, and Oakdale High School qualifying for the Division 4 CIF Playoffs.

Academic rallies
Rallies are held twice a year for students with grade point averages above 2.25, 3.25 and with 4.0's. They are referred to as Lobo Blue (2.25), Lobo Silver (3.25) and Lobo Gold (4.0).

Notable alumni

Joshua Patton (born 1997), basketball player in the Israeli Basketball Premier League

References 

Sierra High Homepage

Public high schools in California
High schools in San Joaquin County, California
Manteca, California
1994 establishments in California
Educational institutions established in 1994